Estadio Modelo Alberto Spencer, also known as just Estadio Modelo, is a multi-purpose stadium in Guayaquil, Ecuador. It is currently used mostly for association football matches and it sometimes hosts games of Rocafuerte Fútbol Club, Club 9 de Octubre, Club Sport Patria, Club Deportivo Everest, Calvi Fútbol Club, Panamá Sporting Club and Club Sport Norteamérica. The stadium holds 42,000, and was opened in July 1959.

After the death of Copa Libertadores all-time top scorer and Ecuadorian national Alberto Spencer in November 2006, the Ecuadorian Football Federation renamed the stadium in his honor to Estadio Modelo Alberto Spencer Herrera.

The stadium was one of the hosts in the 2001 South American U-20 Championship.

Colombian singer Shakira performed a sold-out concert at the stadium on November 30, 2006 as part of her Oral Fixation Tour.

References

Buildings and structures completed in 1959
Football venues in Ecuador
Alberto Spencer
Alberto Spencer
Copa América stadiums
Multi-purpose stadiums in Ecuador
Buildings and structures in Guayaquil